Euriphene atossa, the Atossa nymph, is a butterfly in the family Nymphalidae. It is found in Guinea, Sierra Leone, Liberia, Ivory Coast, Ghana, Togo, Nigeria, Cameroon, Equatorial Guinea, the Republic of the Congo, the Central African Republic, the Democratic Republic of the Congo and Uganda. The habitat consists of forests.

The larvae feed on Combretum species

Subspecies
Euriphene atossa atossa (Guinea, Sierra Leone, Liberia, Ivory Coast, Ghana, Togo, Nigeria, Cameroon, Congo, Central African Republic, Democratic Republic of the Congo: Mayumbe)
Euriphene atossa angusta Hecq, 1994 (Bioko)
Euriphene atossa australis d'Abrera, 1980 (western Uganda, Democratic Republic of the Congo: Mongala, Uele, Ituri, north Kivu, Tshopo, Kasai, Sankuru, Lualaba)

References

Butterflies described in 1865
Euriphene
Butterflies of Africa
Taxa named by William Chapman Hewitson